HMS Alexander was a 74-gun third-rate of the Royal Navy. She was launched at Deptford Dockyard on 8 October 1778. During her career she was captured by the French, and later recaptured by the British. She fought at the Nile in 1798, and was broken up in 1819. She was named after Alexander the Great.

British service and capture
On 13 March 1780, Alexander and HMS Courageaux captured the 40-gun French privateer Monsieur after a long chase and some exchange of fire. The Royal Navy took the privateer into service as HMS Monsieur.

In 1794, whilst returning to England in the company of HMS Canada after escorting a convoy to Spain, Alexander, under the command of Rear-Admiral Richard Rodney Bligh, fell in with a French squadron of five 74-gun ships, and three frigates, led by Joseph-Marie Nielly.  In the action of 6 November 1794 Alexander was overrun by the Droits de l'Homme, but escaped when she damaged the Droits de l'Hommes rigging.  Alexander was then caught by Marat, which came behind her stern and raked her.  Then, the 74 gun third-rate  Jean Bart closed in and fired broadsides at close range, forcing Bligh to surrender Alexander. In the meantime, Canada escaped. The subsequent court martial honourably acquitted Bligh of any blame for the loss of his ship.

The French took her to Brest and then into their French Navy under the name Alexandre. On 22 June 1795, she was with a French fleet off Belle Île when the Channel Fleet under Lord Bridport discovered them. The British ships chased the French fleet, and brought them to action in the Battle of Groix. During the battle HMS Sans Pareil and HMS Colossus recaptured Alexander. After the battle,  towed her back to Plymouth.

Return to British service

They sailed from Gibraltar on 9 May and on 12 May were struck by a violent gale in the Gulf of Lion that carried away Vanguard's topmasts and foremast. The squadron bore up for Sardinia, Alexander taking Vanguard in tow.

The Alexander took part in the Battle of the Nile in 1798, under the command of Captain Alexander Ball. On the evening of 1 August 1798, half an hour before sunset, the battle began. She was the second ship to fire upon the French fleet, engaging the flagship, L'Orient. The Alexander sank three French ships before she had to withdraw due to a small fire on board. The Alexander was one of the few ships not carrying a detachment of soldiers.

, Alexander, and the brig  shared in the proceeds of the French polacca Vengeance, captured entering Valletta, Malta on 6 August.

Alexander served in the navy's Egyptian campaign between 8 March 1801 and 2 September, which qualified her officers and crew for the clasp "Egypt" to the Naval General Service Medal that the Admiralty issued in 1847 to all surviving claimants.

Fate

From 1803 she was out of commission in Plymouth, and was finally broken up in 1819.

See also
 List of ships captured in the 18th century

References
Notes

Citations

 
 
 Lavery, Brian (2003) The Ship of the Line - Volume 1: The development of the battlefleet 1650-1850. Conway Maritime Press. .
 Michael Phillips. Alexander (74) (1778). Michael Phillips' Ships of the Old Navy. Retrieved 11 March 2007.

External links
 HMS Alexander 
 Picture of her launch
 HMS Alexander reference

Ships of the line of the Royal Navy
Alfred-class ships of the line
Ships built in Deptford
1778 ships
Captured ships